Femke Beuling (born 20 December 1999) is a Dutch speed skater who specializes in the sprint distances.

Career 
At the Dutch qualifying tournament in November 2018 she won a ticket for the first three World Cup 500 m events. At the first competition weekend of the 2018–19 ISU Speed Skating World Cup in Obihiro, Japan she finished second in the second 500 m Division B. This earned her a promotion to the Division A at the second competition weekend in Tomakomai, Japan where she finished last in the first 500 m event.

Personal records

Tournament overview

Source:

World Cup overview

 (b) = Division B

References

External links
 Eurosport profile
 SpeedSkatingNews profile
 

1999 births
Living people
Dutch female speed skaters
People from Emmeloord
Sportspeople from Noordoostpolder
21st-century Dutch women